Mater Spei College is a government-aided Catholic secondary school located in Francistown, Botswana. It educates a mixture of boarding and day scholar students in grades (11-12) or form 4 and form 5.

Location
Mater Spei College is located in Botswana's second-largest city, Francistown, in northern Botswana.

History 
Mater Spei College was founded by the Roman Catholic church in 1963. Mater Spei was part of a major development plan by the Roman Catholic church, driven partly by the enthronement of Urban Murphy as the country's first Catholic bishop. It was only the seventh secondary school to be opened in Botswana; the second Catholic secondary school in the country, and one of a number of education developments driven by Christian missions which emerged in the late 1950s. 

The school received considerable financial support from the Botswana government, which made significant capital investment in building projects at the school to support the institution's expansion in its early years. As a result the school was able to expand from one stream per year in 1965 to 20 classes in 1975. In 1979 the school expanded to take over the grounds of the adjoining Our Lady of the Desert Primary School.

School and the learning environment
In 2020 Mater Spei had approximately 1,750 students.  The school has facilities including double-storey classrooms, a multi-purpose hall and a networked (Internet-connected) library. 

In 2018 the school had the second highest academic results in Botswana for the country's BGCE examinations.

Subjects taught
Mater Spei College has twelve subject departments, which includes:

 Religious Education 
English Language
Mathematics
 Science

Optional Subjects
 Design and Technology
 Art and Craft
 Development Studies
 Business Studies
 Geography
 Home Economics
 Agriculture
 English Literature
 History
 Setswana language
A 2016 study found that this school was ahead of others in information and communications technology because of equipment and software provided by a local mining company.

References

See also 

 St. Joseph's College, Kgale
 Education in Botswana
 Mathangwane Village

1963 establishments in Bechuanaland Protectorate
Catholic secondary schools in Africa
Catholic schools in Botswana
Schools in Botswana
Mixed-sex education
Educational institutions established in 1963